Philippe Charles Jean Baptiste Tronson du Coudray (September 8, 1738 – September 11, 1777) was a French army officer who volunteered for service in the Continental Army during the American Revolutionary War.

Early life
Born in Reims, France, du Coudray entered the French military and trained as an artillery specialist. Well connected to the French court (he once tutored the future Charles X on military affairs), du Coudray was a leading proponent of the Gribeauval system of artillery in the Seven Years' War.

American Revolution
By 1775, du Coudray had risen to the rank of chef de brigade, with a posting as an adjutant general. He was a leading figure in the French artillery, having written treatises on subjects such as gunpowder and metallurgy as it applied to the artillery.

In 1776 the American diplomat Silas Deane came to France to recruit skilled military talent, particularly engineers, for the colonial cause.  Impressed by du Coudray, whom he described as the "first engineer" of the French military establishment, Deane agreed to hire du Coudray into the Continental Army with the rank of major general and command of the Continental Army's artillery and engineering corps.  Du Coudray was to recruit engineers in France, and deliver 200 French cannons to the American forces.  The methods by which du Coudray went about recruiting alarmed the French court, which wanted to maintain secrecy in its dealings with the Americans, and du Coudray was ordered to stay in France.  He ignored the order, and slipped out of France, arriving in North America in May 1777.

Deane in fact exceeded his authority in extending the offer to du Coudray, but the Continental Congress felt obliged to honor it, and he was commissioned with the offered rank.  A number of American generals were outraged that high ranks were awarded to foreigners, and the Continental Army's artillery chief, Henry Knox, was particularly incensed that du Coudray would outrank him.  To placate Knox (who threatened to resign over the matter), and to resolve conflicts of command and personality issues between du Coudray and another French engineer, Louis Lebègue Duportail, du Coudray was not assigned to a command position, and was instead appointed as "Inspector General of Ordnance and Military Manufactories" in August 1777.

Du Coudray was somewhat unpopular because of the circumstances surrounding his commissioning, although they were not directly of his making. His superior attitude and aristocratic demeanor did nothing to improve relations with others.  He was at first assigned to survey the defenses around Philadelphia and recommend improvements.  His initial report on the matter suggested developing Red Bank (the site of Fort Mercer), and recommended significant changes to Fort Billingsport, while completely dismissing Fort Mifflin.  General George Washington took an active role in the distribution of the defenses, and chose Fort Mifflin as the primary point of defense in opposition to du Coudray's suggestion.  Du Coudray in a politically astute maneuver backed down from his assessment, and was given the assignment of working at Fort Mifflin.  He continued to lobby Congress on the matter, however, with the result that improvements to all of the forts was slow.

Death
On September 11, 1777, he was riding across a pontoon bridge across the Schuylkill River when his horse suddenly became alarmed, leaping into the river.  Du Coudray, caught in spurs and entanglements, drowned.  His funeral, held at St. Mary's Church in Philadelphia, was attended by many Congressional representatives.  He was buried in the church yard, but the exact grave location is unknown.

References

Sources
Alder, Ken. Engineering the Revolution: Arms and Enlightenment in France, 1763-1815. Chicago: University of Chicago Press, 2010. 
Purcell, L. Edward. Who Was Who in the American Revolution. New York: Facts on File, 1993. .
Walker, Paul. Engineers of Independence. Honolulu: The Minerva Group, 2002. .
Woodward, William. Lafayette. Farrar & Rinehart, Inc., 1938.

1738 births
1777 deaths
American Revolutionary War deaths
Accidental deaths in Pennsylvania
Burials in Pennsylvania
Continental Army generals
Deaths by drowning in the United States
Deaths by horse-riding accident in the United States
French Army officers
French duellists
French military personnel of the American Revolutionary War
French military personnel of the Seven Years' War
Inspectors General of the United States Army
People of colonial Pennsylvania
Military personnel from Reims